The Stewardship Contracting Reauthorization and Improvement Act was a bill introduced in the 113th Congress by U.S. Senator Jeff Flake. The bill would have given the federal government more authority to enter into what are known as "forest stewardship contracts", with the goal of reducing the risk of forest wildfires.

In July 2013, Senator Flake warned the public that the legal authority for forest stewardship contracts would end by September 2013, and without extending the authority, Flake argued that the U.S. Forest Service would lose an important firefighting tool. The bill, which Flake introduced that month, would extend the legal authority for forest stewardship contracts until 2023.

Background

A forest stewardship contract is a type of contract between the U.S. Forest Service and other parties, such as forest industry companies and local government agencies. The contracts are centered around a specific piece of National Forest System land.

The contract can include an agreements on a number of forest projects. For example, a contract could give a company the right to conduct a limited amount of timber and forest restoration work.

Other examples of projects that could be included in a stewardship contract are prescribed burning (for fire prevention), road maintenance, watershed or stream rehabilitation, and the sale of forest products off the same piece of land.

When creating a forest stewardship contract, the Forest Service works with and takes input from several parties such as state and local governments, environmental conservation groups, Native American tribes, and fire safety councils.

If the contract allows forest products, such as timber, to be cut down and sold, the money from the sale is used to offset other activities spelled out in the contract.

In 2012, around 25 percent of all timber taken from National Forest System land was sold under a stewardship contract.

Arizona wildfires

The western United States, and Arizona in particular, suffers from a large number of wildfires every year. In an editorial published on April 25, 2014, The Arizona Republic newspaper wrote the following about wildfires in Arizona and other western states: "Washington, D.C., has not yet intellectually grasped the fact that wildfires in the Western states are every bit as devastating to drought-stricken Arizona, New Mexico and other Western states as hurricanes are to the Gulf Coast and tornadoes are to the Midwest."

In May 2014, a wildfire prompted the evacuation of over 3,000 residents in Coconino County, Arizona. The fire burned thousands of acres between Flagstaff and Sedona. Over 960 firefighters, 15 "hotshot" crews, and three air tankers were required to fight the fire.

Major provisions

Extension of stewardship program

The bill extends the stewardship program another ten years, until the year 2023.

Reserve funds for cancelled contracts

Due to federal rules, the government usually must hold onto the money for a forest stewardship contract for as long as the contract goes on for. Some contracts last up to ten years. The bill would give the government flexibility in how long it holds onto the money, which would help the government cover the cost of canceled contracts.

The bill would allow the government to use any excess income from stewardship contracts to pay for canceled contracts. Currently, the government must pay for the canceled contract upfront in a lump sum. The bill would change that rule to allow payment in stages. According to the Senate committee report on the bill, this change is consistent with rules that the Department of Defense uses in its contracts.

Fire liability 

The bill makes the fire liability provisions of the stewardship contracts equal to the fire liability provisions in timber contracts. Timber contracts have a ceiling on how much fire liability the contractor must carry, but stewardship contracts do not have a ceiling. According to the Senate committee report on the bill, the lack of a ceiling can make stewardship contracts uneconomical for companies bidding on them.

Legislative history
In the late 1990s, Congress passed legislation that created a pilot program for stewardship contracts. In 2003, Congress expanded the stewardship program and authorized it to run until 2013.

On July 16, 2013, Senators Flake introduced the bill, along with four original cosponsors: Senators McCain, Crapo, Risch, and Heller. The Senate Subcommittee on Public Lands, Forests, and Mining held a public hearing on the bill on July 30. On December 19, the Senate Committee on Energy and Natural Resources passed the bill by a voice vote.

Related bills 
The Library of Congress has identified two other bills in Congress that are similar to S. 1300:
 S. 816 - Stewardship End Result Contracting Project Act, introduced by Senator Mark Udall (D-CO)
 S. 849 - Permanent Stewardship Contracting Authority Act of 2013, introduced by Senator Michael Bennet (D-CO)

See also
 List of bills in the 113th United States Congress
 Yarnell Hill Fire
 Wallow Fire
 List of California wildfires
 List of Colorado wildfires

Gallery of Arizona wildfires

References

Further reading 
 Academic articles

 Congressional documentation
Senate Report 113-179, official committee report for S. 1300
 Official report on Senate subcommittee hearing on S. 1300 (S. Hrg. 113-85), Subcommittee on Public Lands, Forests and Mining of the Committee on Energy and Natural Resources, United States Senate (30 July 2013)
 Statement of Ned Farquhar, Deputy Assistant Secretary, Land and Minerals Management, Department of the Interior, Senate Energy and Natural Resources Committee, Subcommittee on Public Lands, Forests, & Mining on S. 1300, Stewardship Contracting Reauthorization and Improvement Act (Bureau of Land Management website) (July 30, 2013)
 Government literature
 Bureau of Land Management - Stewardship Contracts: BLM and Forest Service Issue Direction on Development, Implementation, and Monitoring
 Forests and Rangelands (U.S. government initiative) - Stewardship Contracting
 Navajo County, Arizona - "Sens. Flake and McCain Introduce Legislation to Help Reduce Wildfire Risks" (July 2013)
 State of Colorado - "New legislation aims to improve state's ability to prevent, fight wildfires" (Office of Governor John Hickenlooper) (January 2014)
 U.S. Forest Service - Everything You Wanted to Know About Stewardship End Result Contracting…But Didn't Know What to Ask brochure
 U.S. Forest Service - Timber Sales and Stewardship Contracts
 Legislation information
 Bill summary and status (THOMAS)
 S. 1300 bill tracking (GovTrack)
 Media coverage
 "Editorial: Change in forest policy could avert fire devastation", Las Vegas Review-Journal (4 August 2013)
 "Stewardship contracts would help address forestry needs", Wausau Daily Herald (Wisconsin) (20 January 2014)

Proposed legislation of the 113th United States Congress